Las Flores Partido is a partido of Buenos Aires Province in Argentina.

It is connected to the rest of the province by National Route 3 and Provincial Routes RP 30, RP 61 and RP 63.

Economy
The economy of Las Flores partido is dominated by agriculture. The mainstays of agricultural production in the region are arable crops, cattle, and dairy farming.

Settlements
Las Flores
Coronel Boerr
El Trigo
Pardo
Rosas
PLaza Montero
El Gualichu
La Porteña
Vilela
El Mosquito 
Harosteguy
Estrugamou
Pago de Oro
El Despunte
El Tropezón
Sol de Mayo
El Toro

References

External links

 

1839 establishments in Argentina
Partidos of Buenos Aires Province